The World Agriculture Prize has been awarded annually since 2013 by the Global Confederation of Higher Education Associations for the Agricultural and Life Sciences (GCHERA). The Prize recognizes academics in agriculture and life sciences who have demonstrated career-spanning dedication to research, education, innovation and outreach. These contributions are measured within each recipient's institution geographical scope and as a result these impacts need not be global in scope. 2020 Laurates were awarded $100,000 each.

Laureates

References 

Agriculture awards
Academic awards